Parliamentary elections were held in Albania on 25 June. They had initially been scheduled for 18 June, but after a possible boycott was announced by opposition parties during a political crisis that lasted three months, an agreement was reached between all parties on 18 May to change the date. The Socialist Party won 74 of the 140 seats.

Background
The previous parliamentary elections were held on 23 June 2013 and resulted in a victory for the Socialist Party of Albania-led Alliance for a European Albania, which received 57.6% of the vote, winning 83 of the 140 seats. The opposition Alliance for Employment, Prosperity and Integration headed by Lulzim Basha of the Democratic Party received almost 39.5% of the vote and won the other 57 seats. The Socialist Party led by Edi Rama formed the government with Rama as Prime Minister.

Electoral system
The 140 members of Parliament were elected in twelve multi-member constituencies based on the twelve counties using closed list proportional representation with an electoral threshold of 3% for parties and 5% for alliances. Seats were allocated to alliances using the D'Hondt method, then to political parties using the Sainte-Laguë method.

Demographic changes led to some changes in the number of seats for some constituencies; Tirana gained two seats and Durrës one, whilst Korça, Berat and Kukës all lost a seat.

Contesting parties

Opinion polls

Nationwide

By county

Tirana

Elbasan

Results

By county

References

Albania
2017 in Albania
Parliamentary elections in Albania
June 2017 events in Europe